Events from the year 1553 in art.

Events
 Maarten van Heemskerck becomes curate of St. Bavochurch, where he serves 22 years
 After Bonifazio Veronese dies, Palma il Giovane takes over his workshop and clientele

Paintings

 Titian - Venus and Adonis
 Giovanni Battista Moroni - Portrait of a Man

Births
date unknown
Cherubino Alberti or Borghegiano, Italian engraver and painter (died 1615)
Jerónimo de Ayanz y Beaumont, Spanish soldier, painter, musician and inventor (died 1613)
Juan Pantoja de la Cruz, Spanish painter  (died 1608)
Niccolò Granello, Italian fresco painter established in Spain (died 1593)
Hieronymus Wierix, Flemish engraver (died 1619)

Deaths
February - Augustin Hirschvogel, German artist, mathematician, and cartographer known primarily for his etchings (born 1503)
May 22 - Giovanni Bernardi, Italian gem engraver and medalist (born 1494)
June 3 - Wolf Huber, Austrian painter, printmaker, and architect, a leading member of the Danube School (born 1485)
October 16 - Lucas Cranach the Elder, German painter and printmaker in woodcut and engraving (born 1472)
October 19 - Bonifazio Veronese, Italian Mannerist painter from Venice (born 1487)
date unknown 
Giorgio Andreoli, Italian potter of the Italian Renaissance, inventor of a particular kind of lusterware (lustro) (born 1465/1470)
Cornelis Anthonisz., Dutch painter, engraver and mapmaker (born 1505)
Adriaen Pietersz Crabeth, Dutch glass painter (born 1510)
Francesco Signorelli - Italian Renaissance painter (born 1495)
probable - Domenico Alfani, Italian painter (born 1480)

 
Years of the 16th century in art